Sierra de Cádiz (Spanish: "Cádiz Mountains") is a comarca (county, but with no administrative role) province of Cádiz (Andalusia, southern Spain).

Most of the comarca's territory falls within the Sierra de Grazalema Natural Park, a protected area.

Municipalities 

The Sierra de Cádiz comarca includes the following municipalities:
Alcalá del Valle
Algar
Algodonales
Arcos de la Frontera
Benaocaz
Bornos
El Bosque
El Gastor
Espera
Grazalema
Olvera
Prado del Rey
Puerto Serrano
Setenil de las Bodegas
Torre Alháquime
Ubrique
Villaluenga del Rosario
Villamartín
Zahara de la Sierra

External links
El portal de la Sierra de Cádiz en internet

Comarcas of the Province of Cádiz